Michal Schwartz (born 1 January 1950) is a professor of Neuroimmunology at the Weizmann Institute of Science and is internationally acclaimed as a path-breaking scientist in the study of Neuro-immunology, introducing the dialogue between the immune system and the brain as novel and pivotal player in life-long brain function and repair. Prof. Michal Schwartz's groundbreaking discovery has revolutionized the field of neurodegenerative diseases, and led to a transformation in searching treatments for neurodegenerative diseases, Her immunotherapeutic approach to treat of harnessing the immune system to help brain to treat terminal neurodegenerative brain diseases such as Alzheimer Disease and Dementia, is currently in expedite process of development.

In her studies, she has shown, against prevailing wisdom at the time, that the immune system, supports a health brain's function, and is vital for healing and protecting the brain in case of injury or disease. Schwartz's research has not only changed the accepted scientific dogma, but laid the foundation worldwide for developing new research and treatment approaches in the field of brain disease and neurodegenerative conditions, particularly Alzheimer Disease and Dementia.

She discovered new roles for immune cells in repair and neurogenesis, coining the term "Protective autoimmunity" and expanding the field of immunology in neuroscience. She has been the elected chair of the International Society of Neuroimmunology (ISNI) since 2016, and her book "Neuroimmunity: A New Science that will Revolutionize How We Keep Our Brains Healthy and Young" received an honorable mention for the 2016 PROSE Awards, Biomedicine & Neuroscience category.  Her Google scholar Citation Index is 113.

Education 
Schwartz gained her Bachelor of Science (with distinction) in chemistry at Hebrew University of Jerusalem in 1972. She received her PhD in Immunology in 1977 at the Weizmann Institute of Science, where she would later spend the majority of her career. She also spent time at the University of Michigan, Ann Arbor, researching nerve regeneration.

Career and research 
At the Weizmann Institute she progressed from senior scientist in the Department of Neurobiology to a full professor in 1998, then awarded the Maurice and Ilse Katz Professorial Chair in Neuroimmunology in 2016.
Schwartz's work in neuroimmunology has encompassed a wide range of pathologies in the central nervous system (CNS) including : injury, neurodegeneration, mental dysfunction, and aging. By researching the immune system and its interactions with the brain, Schwartz focuses on improving repair, regeneration and neuroplasticity in health and disease. She coined the term "protective autoimmunity' and demonstrated the role of immune cells such as macrophages and T cells in spinal cord repair. She also identified specific brain areas for 'cross talk' between the CNS and the immune system. This cross talk is important for recruiting immune cells and maintaining a healthy brain, and her work outlines how disruption of this crosstalk can play a role in brain aging and neurodegenerative disease. She also showed this role in pregnancy and fetal brain development, where immune disruption in the mother can be linked to neurodevelopmental disorders in children. Another focus of her work has been on repurposing cancer immunotherapies such as PD-1 blockers to treat neurodegenerative disorders such as Alzheimer's disease.

Macrophages
The Schwartz team was the first to discover that bone marrow-derived macrophages are needed for central nervous system (CNS) repair. Thus, her group not only reversed a long-held dogma that immune cells are detrimental to brain function, but also established the role of novel participants in CNS repair never considered previously. They further demonstrated that the brain-resident myeloid cells (the microglia), and infiltrating monocyte-derived macrophages are not redundant populations, despite their myeloid phenotype, and display distinct functions in resolution of brain inflammation. These findings completely changed the understanding of the role of bone marrow-derived macrophages in containing brain diseases, to the extent that the current question is no longer whether bone marrow-derived macrophages are needed for brain repair, but how to safely recruit them, and elucidating the routes of their physiological entry to the brain.

 Rapalino, O.,O. Lazarov-Spiegler, E. Agranov,G. J. Velan,E. Yoles,M. Fraidakis,A. Solomon,R. Gepstein,A. Katz,M. Belkin,M. Hadani,M. Schwartz. "Implantation of stimulated homologous macrophages results in partial recovery of paraplegic rats." Nat Med 4, no. 7 (Jul 1998): 814-21.
 Shechter, R.,A. London,C. Varol,C. Raposo,M. Cusimano,G. Yovel,A. Rolls,M. Mack,S. Pluchino,G. Martino,S. Jung,M. Schwartz. "Infiltrating blood-derived macrophages are vital cells playing an anti-inflammatory role in recovery from spinal cord injury in mice." PLoS Med 6, no. 7 (Jul 2009): e1000113. 
 Shechter, R.,O. Miller,G. Yovel,N. Rosenzweig,A. London,J. Ruckh,K. W. Kim,E. Klein,V. Kalchenko,P. Bendel,S. A. Lira,S. Jung,M. Schwartz. "Recruitment of beneficial M2 macrophages to the injured spinal cord is orchestrated by remote brain choroid plexus." Immunity 38, no. 3 (Mar 21 2013): 555-69.

Autoimmunity
Schwartz discovered that the ability to cope with sterile CNS injuries requires support in the form of an adaptive immune response mediated by CD4+ T cells that recognize CNS antigens. She coined the concept of protective autoimmunity, to distinguish this response from autoimmune disease, in which the anti-self response escapes control. Over the years, it became clear that adaptive immunity is needed to facilitate recruitment of immunoregulatory cells, including bone marrow-derived macrophages and FoxP3 regulatory T cells, though the balance between regulatory T cells and effector memory cells is different in the periphery versus the brain.

 Moalem, G.,R. Leibowitz-Amit,E. Yoles,F. Mor,I. R. Cohen,M. Schwartz. "Autoimmune T cells protect neurons from secondary degeneration after central nervous system axotomy." Nat Med 5, no. 1 (Jan 1999): 49-55. 
 Yoles, E.,E. Hauben,O. Palgi,E. Agranov,A. Gothilf,A. Cohen,V. Kuchroo,I. R. Cohen,H. Weiner,M. Schwartz. "Protective autoimmunity is a physiological response to CNS trauma." J Neurosci 21, no. 11 (Jun 1 2001): 3740-8. 
 Hauben, E.,E. Agranov,A. Gothilf,U. Nevo,A. Cohen,I. Smirnov,L. Steinman,M. Schwartz. "Posttraumatic therapeutic vaccination with modified myelin self-antigen prevents complete paralysis while avoiding autoimmune disease." J Clin Invest 108, no. 4 (Aug 2001): 591-9.

Brain Homeostasis
Schwartz’s team discovered the unexpected role of adaptive systemic immune cells, and specifically T cells recognizing brain antigens (Protective autoimmune T cells), in supporting the cognitive capacity of the healthy brain, for lifelong neurogenesis, and functional brain plasticity. These seminal observations paved the way for numerous additional discoveries in which the brain-immune axis were described.

 Kipnis, J.,H. Cohen,M. Cardon,Y. Ziv,M. Schwartz. "T cell deficiency leads to cognitive dysfunction: implications for therapeutic vaccination for schizophrenia and other psychiatric conditions." Proc Natl Acad Sci U S A 101, no. 21 (May 25, 2004): 8180-5. 
 Ziv, Y.,N. Ron,O. Butovsky,G. Landa,E. Sudai,N. Greenberg,H. Cohen,J. Kipnis,M. Schwartz. "Immune cells contribute to the maintenance of neurogenesis and spatial learning abilities in adulthood." Nat Neurosci 9, no. 2 (Feb 2006): 268-75. 
 Baruch, K.,A. Deczkowska,E. David,J. M. Castellano,O. Miller,A. Kertser,T. Berkutzki,Z. Barnett-Itzhaki,D. Bezalel,T. Wyss-Coray,I. Amit,M. Schwartz. "Aging. Aging-induced type I interferon response at the choroid plexus negatively affects brain function." Science 346, no. 6205 (Oct 3 2014): 89-93.

The Choroid Plexus
Schwartz’s team identified the brain’s choroid plexus (CP), within the blood-cerebrospinal fluid-barrier, as an immunological interface between the brain and the immune system, serving as a niche that hosts immune cells, and as a physiological entry gate for leukocytes. Focusing on this unique niche within brain led the Schwartz group to propose that that IFN-γ holds the key to regulating CP gateway activity. Her team further showed that in brain aging and neurodegenerative diseases (studied using both mouse models and human samples), dysfunction of this interface is determined both by signals originating in the brain, and signals from the aged immune system, which led to the identification of Type-I Interferon (IFN-I) at the CP as negative player, affecting the fate of the aging brain in general, and of microglia, in particular. A similar IFN-I signature at the CP was subsequently discovered by others in Alzheimer’s disease, and in postmortem brains of infected patients who died from COVID-19.

 Shechter, R.,O. Miller,G. Yovel,N. Rosenzweig,A. London,J. Ruckh,K. W. Kim,E. Klein,V. Kalchenko,P. Bendel,S. A. Lira,S. Jung,M. Schwartz. "Recruitment of beneficial M2 macrophages to injured spinal cord is orchestrated by remote brain choroid plexus." Immunity 38, no. 3 (Mar 21 2013): 555-69. 
 Kunis, G.,K. Baruch,N. Rosenzweig,A. Kertser,O. Miller,T. Berkutzki,M. Schwartz. "IFN-gamma-dependent activation of the brain's choroid plexus for CNS immune surveillance and repair." Brain 136, no. Pt 11 (Nov 2013): 3427-40. 
 Baruch, K.,A. Deczkowska,E. David,J. M. Castellano,O. Miller,A. Kertser,T. Berkutzki,Z. Barnett-Itzhaki,D. Bezalel,T. Wyss-Coray,I. Amit,M. Schwartz. "Aging. Aging-induced type I interferon response at the choroid plexus negatively affects brain function." Science 346, no. 6205 (Oct 3 2014): 89-93. 
 Deczkowska, A.,O. Matcovitch-Natan,A. Tsitsou-Kampeli,S. Ben-Hamo,R. Dvir-Szternfeld,A. Spinrad,O. Singer,E. David,D. R. Winter,L. K. Smith,A. Kertser,K. Baruch,N. Rosenzweig,A. Terem,M. Prinz,S. Villeda,A. Citri,I. Amit,M. Schwartz. "Mef2C restrains microglial inflammatory response and is lost in brain ageing in an IFN-I-dependent manner." Nat Commun 8, no. 1 (Sep 28 2017): 717.

Immunotherapy 
The discovery that adaptive immunity plays a key role in brain function and repair, the need for bone marrow-derived macrophages to resolve local brain inflammation, the fact that Alzheimer's Disease (AD) and all forms of dementia are mainly age-related diseases, and the fact that the immune system is particularly affected by aging all led Schwartz to propose a new treatment for combating dementias. Schwartz suggested empowering systemic immunity, using a form of immunotherapy by modestly blocking the inhibitory immune checkpoint PD1/PD-L1 pathway. This treatment drives an immune-dependent cascade of events, that allows harnessing of bone marrow-derived macrophages and regulatory T cells to help clear toxic factors from the diseased brain, and to arrest the local inflammation, thereby providing a comprehensive multi-factorial therapy through modification of multiple elements that go awry in AD. Development of therapies that directly target the peripheral immune system is likely to herald a new era in the desperate search for a treatment for AD and other neurodegenerative diseases. Schwartz’s patents for developing such an immunotherapy for AD are licensed to a small Biopharma company, Immnobrain Checkpoint. The company is awaiting a clinical trial in AD patients, supported in part by the National Institute of Aging, US National Institutes of Health, and The Alzheimer's Association.

 Baruch, K.,A. Deczkowska, N. Rosenzweig, A. Tsitsou-Kampeli,A. M. Sharif,O. Matcovitch-Natan, A. Kertser,E. David,I. Amit,M. Schwartz. "PD-1 immune checkpoint blockade reduces pathology and improves memory in mouse models of Alzheimer's disease." Nat Med 22, no. 2 (Feb 2016): 135-7. 
 Schwartz, M. "Can immunotherapy treat neurodegeneration?" Science 357, no. 6348 (Jul 21 2017): 254-55. 
 Rosenzweig, N.,R. Dvir-Szternfeld,A. Tsitsou-Kampeli,H. Keren-Shaul,H. Ben-Yehuda,P. Weill-Raynal,L. Cahalon,A. Kertser,K. Baruch,I. Amit,A. Weiner,M. Schwartz. "PD-1/PD-L1 checkpoint blockade harnesses monocyte-derived macrophages to combat cognitive impairment in a tauopathy mouse model." Nat Commun 10, no. 1 (Jan 28 2019): 465. 
 Ben-Yehuda, H.,M. Arad,J. M. Peralta Ramos,E. Sharon,G. Castellani,S. Ferrera,L. Cahalon,S. P. Colaiuta,T. M. Salame,M. Schwartz. "Key role of the CCR2-CCL2 axis in disease modification in a mouse model of tauopathy." Mol Neurodegener 16, no. 1 (Jun 25 2021): 39. 
 Dvir-Szternfeld R, Castellani G, Arad M, Cahalon L, Phoebeluc Colaiuta S, Keren-Shaul  H, Croese T, Ulland T, Colonna M, Weiner A, Amit I, Schwartz M'. 2021. TREM2-independent neuroprotection is mediated by monocyte-derived macrophages in a mouse model of Alzheimer’s disease  Nature Aging,

Students 

Schwartz has mentored approximately 40 PhD students (12 of whom received recognition awards by The Feinberg Graduate School for their achievements during their PhD), and approximately 39 MSc students (8 of whom received a recognition award for their excellence during their MSc). Her former PhD students include Jonathan Kipnis, Jasmin Fisher and Asya Rolls.

References 

Women immunologists
Academic staff of Weizmann Institute of Science
Weizmann Institute of Science alumni
1950 births
People from Tel Aviv
Hebrew University of Jerusalem alumni
University of Michigan alumni
Israeli immunologists
Israeli neuroscientists
Living people